The 1967–68 Gonzaga Bulldogs men's basketball team represented Gonzaga University during the 1967–68 NCAA University Division basketball season. In the fifth season of the Big Sky Conference, the Bulldogs were led by seventeenth-year head coach Hank Anderson and played their home games on campus at Kennedy Pavilion in Spokane, Washington.

References

External links
Sports Reference – Gonzaga Bulldogs: 1967–68 basketball season

Gonzaga Bulldogs men's basketball seasons
Gonzaga